The Old Vicarage in Wakefield, West Yorkshire, England is a building dating from .

Located on Zetland Street, the building and surrounding car park are linked to a network of tunnels, believed to be used by non-conformists after the Act of Uniformity was passed in 1662.

The Old Vicarage is owned by the Wakefield County Conservative Association and is currently occupied by independent shops.

References

Buildings and structures in Wakefield
Clergy houses in England
Buildings and structures completed in 1349
Houses in West Yorkshire